John Lewthwaite (1816 – 2 August 1892) was a 19th-century Member of Parliament in the Taranaki Region of New Zealand.

He died in London on 2 August 1892. He had developed a machine for printing railway tickets and a method of harbour construction

References

1816 births
1892 deaths
Members of the New Zealand House of Representatives
New Zealand MPs for North Island electorates
19th-century New Zealand politicians